Playlist: The Very Best of Dixie Chicks is the greatest hits album from American country band the Dixie Chicks. The album consists of twelve songs personally selected by the Dixie Chicks from their fourth through seventh studio albums. It was released in the United States on June 1, 2010. The group supported the album by touring with The Eagles in 2010.  It is a part of Sony BMG's Playlist series. It was also re-released on Sony's midprice sub-label Camden entitled Wide Open Spaces: The Collection in 2012.

Critical reception
Playlist: The Very Best of Dixie Chicks received four stars out of five from Stephen Thomas Erlewine of Allmusic. Erlewine wrote that "the tracks are sharply selected, making for a good, representative compilation if not quite a definitive one." Matt Bjorke of Roughstock gave the compilation three and a half stars out of five, calling it "a great representation of who they are as artists" while adding "it will also have to serve as a placeholder for chicks fans until their label does eventually get around to releasing a career-spanning ‘greatest hits’ record."

Track listing

Chart performance
Playlist: The Very Best of Dixie Chicks peaked at number 27 on the U.S. Billboard Top Country Albums chart the week of June 19, 2010 and number 165 on the Billboard 200.

References

The Chicks compilation albums
Dixie Chicks
2010 compilation albums
Columbia Records compilation albums